A New Cure for Divorce is a 1912 American silent short drama film written by Lloyd Lonergan. The film stars William Garwood and Mignon Anderson.

Plot summary

Cast
 William Garwood as The Groom
 Mignon Anderson as The Bride

External links

1912 films
1912 drama films
Thanhouser Company films
Silent American drama films
American silent short films
American black-and-white films
1912 short films
1910s American films